Joseph Bailey (March 18, 1810 – August 26, 1885) was an American politician from Pennsylvania who served as a Democratic member of the U.S. House of Representatives for Pennsylvania's 16th congressional district from 1861 to 1863 and for Pennsylvania's 15th congressional district from 1863 to 1865.

He served as a member of the Pennsylvania State Senate for the 1st district from 1843 to 1844 and the 4th district from 1851 to 1853.  He served as Pennsylvania State Treasurer from 1854 to 1855 and as a member of the Pennsylvania House of Representatives from 1840 to 1841.

Early life and education
Joseph Bailey was born in Pennsbury Township, Pennsylvania. He attended the common schools, and worked as a hatter in Parkersville, Pennsylvania.

Career
He served in the Pennsylvania State House of Representatives in 1840. He was a member of the Pennsylvania State Senate for the 1st district from 1843 to 1844. In 1845, he moved to Perry County, Pennsylvania to become a furnace owner.  He was elected again to the Pennsylvania State Senate for the 4th district and served from 1851 to 1853. He served as State Treasurer of Pennsylvania in 1854. He studied law and was admitted to the bar in 1860.

Baily was elected as a Democrat to the Thirty-seventh and Thirty-eighth Congresses. He was a member of the State Constitutional Convention in 1872.

He died at Bailey Station, Pennsylvania in 1885 and is interred in Bloomfield Cemetery in New Bloomfield, Pennsylvania.

Notes

Sources 

The Political Graveyard

|-

|-

1810 births
1885 deaths
19th-century American politicians
American milliners
Democratic Party members of the Pennsylvania House of Representatives
Pennsylvania lawyers
Democratic Party members of the United States House of Representatives from Pennsylvania
Democratic Party Pennsylvania state senators
People from Pennsbury Township, Pennsylvania
State treasurers of Pennsylvania
19th-century American lawyers

Politicians from Chester County, Pennsylvania